Bradley Jackson Kendell (born 8 February 1981 in Clearwater, Florida) is a U.S. Paralympic sailor. He won a silver medal in the 2016 Summer Paralympics in the Three-Person Keelboat (Sonar).

Biography
In 2003, he was the only survivor in a deadly airplane accident which killed Bradley's father and a family friend, despite losing both of his legs. His father was originally from New Zealand and also a sailor. 

He received a hero's welcome at Tampa International Airport after returning from Rio as a Paralympic Games silver medalist.

References

Sailors at the 2016 Summer Paralympics
Paralympic silver medalists for the United States
Living people
1981 births
American male sailors (sport)
People from Clearwater, Florida
Survivors of aviation accidents or incidents
Medalists at the 2016 Summer Paralympics
Paralympic medalists in sailing
Paralympic sailors of the United States